HGTV Star, named HGTV Design Star for the first seven seasons, is an American reality competition show that premiered on July 23, 2006, on the cable television network HGTV. Clive Pearse served as host for Seasons 1-4, then judge Vern Yip served as host for Season 5, replacing Clive Pearse. HGTV'D host Tanika Ray served as host for Season 6 and Design Star Season 1 winner David Bromstad join the show as a mentor. Bromstad later return not only as mentor but as host, replacing Tanika Ray, for the remainder of the show including Design Star:All Stars, even though Tanika Ray announce as host for Season 7. Vern Yip (Deserving Design), Genevieve Gorder (Dear Genevieve), and Sabrina Soto (The High/Low Project) currently serve as the show's three judges. Candice Olson ("Divine Design", "Candice Tells All") served as a judge for seasons 4 and 5; starting with season 6, a third rotating judge was brought in to fill the spot left by Olson. Previous judges include Cynthia Rowley, a designer of fashion and home accessories; and Martha McCully, Executive Editor of InStyle magazine.

The contestants compete for their own design show on HGTV, which follows the format of The Next Food Network Star on sister channel Food Network. Each week, the judges decide whom to eliminate; and, in Seasons 1-4, Clive Pearse would tell the contestant(s) who had been eliminated, "Your show has been cancelled...please exit the studio."

Each week, the remaining contestants participate in an interior design challenge such as designing a living space with a specific purpose (bedroom, livingroom, garage) or creating a space in an empty room, using unconventional items from a pet store, mechanics store, or a discount store. The designers are given a specified amount of time and cash to create their designs, sometimes working alone and sometimes in teams.

The series was cancelled after eight seasons. On November 2, 2020, it was announced that a spin-off titled Design Star: Next Gen will premiere in 2021.

Cast

Presenters

Judges

Seasons

Season 1

Winner: David Bromstad
Location: New York City, New York
Host: Clive Pearse
Judges: Vern Yip, Cynthia Rowley, Martha McCully

Season 2

Winner: Kim Myles
Location: Las Vegas, Nevada
Host: Clive Pearse
Judges: Vern Yip, Cynthia Rowley, Martha McCully

Season 3

Winner: Jennifer Bertrand
Location: Nashville, Tennessee
Host: Clive Pearse
Judges: Vern Yip, Cynthia Rowley, Martha McCully

Season 4

This was Clive Pearse's final season as host, and two new judges (Olson and Gorder) joined the panel.
Winner: Antonio Ballatore
Location: Los Angeles, California
Host: Clive Pearse
Judges: Vern Yip, Candice Olson, Genevieve Gorder

Season 5

Season 5 featured a new producer and a new format. Prop stylist Emily Henderson won the competition; and her show, Secrets from a Stylist, premiered August 29, 2010.
Winner: Emily Henderson
Location: New York City, New York
Host: Vern Yip
Judges: Vern Yip, Candice Olson, Genevieve Gorder

Season 6

This season features Tanika Ray as host and David Bromstad as mentor. It premiered July 11, 2011.

Winner: Meg Caswell
Location: New York City, New York
Host: Tanika Ray
Judges: Vern Yip, Candice Olson, Genevieve Gorder
Mentor: David Bromstad

Season 7

This season features David Bromstad as host and mentor. It premiered May 29, 2012.

Winner: Danielle Colding
Location: Los Angeles, California
Host: David Bromstad (Tanika Ray was originally announced as host)
Judges: Vern Yip, Genevieve Gorder
Mentor: David Bromstad

All Stars

This season features David Bromstad as host and mentor. It premiered July 31, 2012.

Winner: Leslie Ezelle
Location: Dallas, Texas
Host: David Bromstad
Judges: Vern Yip, Genevieve Gorder
Mentor: David Bromstad

Season 8

This season features David Bromstad as the host and mentor. It premiered June 9, 2013.

Winner: Tiffany Brooks
Location: Los Angeles, California
Host: David Bromstad
Judges: Vern Yip, Genevieve Gorder, Sabrina Soto
Mentor: David Bromstad

See also
 Ellen's Design Challenge
 Designer Superstar Challenge

References

External links 
 
 
 
 Kim Myles Q&A at AllYourTV.com
 David Bromstad Q&A at AllYourTV.com

2000s American reality television series
2010s American reality television series
HGTV original programming
2006 American television series debuts
2013 American television series endings